is a city located in Saitama Prefecture, Japan. , the city had an estimated population of 77,900 in 35,026 households and a population density of 870 persons per km².

Geography
Honjō is located on the northwestern border of Saitama Prefecture, bordered by the upper reaches of the Tone River to the north.

Surrounding municipalities
Saitama Prefecture
 Fukaya
 Kamisato
 Kamikawa
 Nagatoro
 Minano
Gunma Prefecture
 Isesaki
 Tamamura

Climate
Honjō has a humid subtropical climate (Köppen Cfa) characterized by warm summers and cool winters with light to no snowfall.  The average annual temperature in Honjō is 14.5 °C. The average annual rainfall is 1258 mm with September as the wettest month. The temperatures are highest on average in August, at around 26.7 °C, and lowest in January, at around 3.9 °C.

Demographics
Per Japanese census data, the population of Honjō peaked around the year 2000 and has declined since.

History
The area of Honjō has been inhabited since prehistoric times and numerous burial mounds from the Kofun period have been found in the area. During the Kamakura period, the area was dominated by the Honjō clan, who continued to rule over a castle town and eventually the short-lived Honjō Domain during the early Tokugawa shogunate of the Edo period. After the suppression of Honjō Domain, the town continued to prosper as Honjō-juku, a post station on the Nakasendo highway. During the late Edo period and early Meiji period, the area was noted for sericulture. The town of Honjō was created within Kodama District, Saitama with the establishment of the modern municipalities system on April 1, 1889. Honjō was elevated to city status on July 1, 1954 by merging with neighboring Fujita, Nitte, Asahi and Kitaizumi villages. On January 10, 2006, the town of Kodama was merged into Honjō.

Government
Honjō has a mayor-council form of government with a directly elected mayor and a unicameral city council of 21 members. Honjō, together with the towns of Kamikawa and Kamisato, contributes two members to the Saitama Prefectural Assembly. In terms of national politics, the city is part of Saitama 11th district of the lower house of the Diet of Japan.

Economy
The economy of Honjō is based on light and precision manufacturing and agriculture, and the city is also a regional commercial center.

Education
Waseda University has a campus at Honjō
Honjō has 13 public elementary schools and four public middle schools operated by the city government, and three public high schools operated by the Saitama Prefectural Board of Education. In addition, the are two private combined middle/high schools and one private high school. The prefecture also operates one special education school for the handicapped.
International schools:  Escola Intercultural Unificada Arco Íris - Brazilian school Previously the city hosted another Brazilian school, Centro de Aprendizagem Logos.

Transportation

Railway
 JR East –Joetsu Shinkansen
 
 JR East – Takasaki Line
 
 JR East – Hachikō Line

Highway
  – Honjō-Kodama IC

Sister city relations
  Kazo, Saitama, Japan  
  Shibukawa, Gunma, Japan

Local attractions
 Honjō Circuit, a small motorsports circuit
 Sagiyama kofun
 Maze Dam
 Honjo City Museum of History and Folklore

Notable people
Takekoshi Yosaburō, historian and politician
Yukiko Kada, politician
Jaki Numazawa, professional wrestler
, actress, a former member of the idol group Nogizaka46

References

External links

Official Website 

Cities in Saitama Prefecture
Honjō, Saitama